The Rural Municipality of Eagle Creek No. 376 is a rural municipality (RM) in the Canadian province of Saskatchewan within Census Division No. 12 and  Division No. 5. It is located west of the City of Saskatoon.

History 
The RM of Eagle Creek No. 376 incorporated as a rural municipality on December 13, 1909.

Geography

Communities and localities 
The following unincorporated communities are located within the RM.

Localities
 Arelee (dissolved as a village)
 Enviren
 Sonningdale
 Struan

Demographics 

Government 
The RM of Eagle Creek No. 376 is governed by an elected municipal council and an appointed administrator that meets on the second Tuesday of every month. The reeve of the RM is Wendy Davis while its administrator is Trent Smith. The RM's office is located in Asquith.

See also 
List of rural municipalities in Saskatchewan

References 

E